Felisha Legette-Jack (born September 4, 1966) is the current head coach of the Syracuse University's women basketball team. She previously served as the head coach at the University at Buffalo, Indiana University, and Hofstra University's women basketball teams.

Early life and education
Coming from a athletically gifted family, Legette-Jack first came to prominence at Nottingham Senior High School in the mid 1980s. Her brother, Ronnie, had led the Bulldogs to a state championship earlier, but Felisha went one better, leading the Lady Bulldogs to two state titles before going on to star at Syracuse University. At Syracuse, Legette-Jack scored 1,526 points, grabbed 927 rebounds, and graduated as the all-time leading scorer and rebounder in program history. As of 2021, she ranks fifth in scoring and third in rebounds. She was the 1985 Big East Rookie of the Year, and all-league player three times, and was the recipient of a LetterWinner of Distinction Award. 
Syracuse retired Legette-Jack's basketball jersey (#33) in November 2021. She became the first women’s basketball player at Syracuse to have her number retired, and one of the first three female athletes to have their uniforms retired by the Orange.

Coaching career
After graduating from Syracuse, Legette-Jack became an assistant coach for the Boston College Eagles women's basketball and then returned to Syracuse in similar role, working under Marianna Freeman from 1993 to 2000.

From 2002 to 2006, she served as the head coach at Hofstra.

Indiana University
In April 2006, Legette-Jack was hired at Indiana. She was fired by IU Athletic Director Fred Glass on Monday, March 12, 2012. She was hired by University at Buffalo Athletic Director Danny White on June 14, 2012, marking White's first coaching hire at UB.

University at Buffalo
After being hired as the new women's basketball coach at Buffalo, Coach Legette-Jack made significant advances to the program. Under her leadership, Buffalo earned four trips to the NCAA Division I women's basketball tournament, in 2016, 2018, 2019 and 2022. The 2016 tournament appearance was the first in program history. The 2018 appearance culminated in Buffalo's first run to the Sweet Sixteen in program history.

USA Basketball
Legette-Jack served as an assistant coach of the  U19 team representing the US at the 2005 FIBA Americas U19 Championship for Women in Tunis, Tunisia. The USA team won all eight of their games, including the championship game against Serbia & Montenegro.  Crystal Langhorne  hit 77.5% of her field goal attempts, to lead the USA scorers with over 16 points per game.  Candice Wiggins was close behind with almost 16 points per game. The USA team was dominant, winning every game by more than 20 points.

Syracuse University
On March 26, 2022, Legette-Jack was officially announced as the head coach of Syracuse which marked a return to her alma mater.

Head coaching record
Source:

References

External links
Official Indiana Hoosiers bio
Syracuse Hall of Fame page
Legette Jack on 'Cuse Conversations Podcast in 2021

1966 births
Living people
American women's basketball coaches
Basketball coaches from New York (state)
Boston College Eagles women's basketball coaches
Buffalo Bulls women's basketball coaches
High school basketball coaches in the United States
Hofstra Pride women's basketball coaches
Indiana Hoosiers women's basketball coaches
Michigan State Spartans women's basketball coaches
Syracuse Orange women's basketball coaches
Syracuse Orange women's basketball players
Basketball players from Syracuse, New York